Mark Peter Connor (born May 27, 1949 in Brooklyn, New York) is a former pitching coach for the Baltimore Orioles and Texas Rangers. Before his coaching career, he was a minor league pitcher from 1971 through 1972 who batted and threw right-handed.

Playing career
Connor played two minor league seasons for the Minnesota Twins before his career was ended by an arm injury. He went 4-5 with a 2.78 ERA, three saves, and 57 strikeouts in 55 innings for the 1971 Auburn Twins. The following season, he posted a 5-2 record with a 3.83 ERA in 32 relief appearances for the Wisconsin Rapids Twins.

Coaching career
Following his playing career, Connor became the pitching coach at the University of Tennessee from 1974 to 1978 and served as the head coach in 1988 and 1989. He also coached in the major leagues for the New York Yankees (1984–87, 1990–93), Arizona Diamondbacks (1998–2000) and Toronto Blue Jays (2001–02) before joining Texas (2003). Tommy John called Connor a "brilliant coach." "He knew what to look for in my motion and had an intuitive understanding of the way I threw the baseball." Even after Connor left the Yankees, John still sought him out for help. Under his guidance, Randy Johnson earned consecutive NL Cy Young Award honors in 1999 and 2000.

Connor served as the bullpen coach of the Rangers from 2003–2005, and became the team's pitching coach in 2006. At the end of the season, the team named Ron Washington as their new manager for the 2007 season. Washington kept Connor as the pitching coach.

Conner was fired by the Texas Rangers on August 1, 2008. The Rangers re-hired Connor as a consultant in December 2008.

Connor joined the Baltimore Orioles as their pitching coach for the 2011 season. He resigned on June 14 due to personal reasons.

References

External links

1949 births
Living people
Arizona Diamondbacks coaches
Baltimore Orioles coaches
Texas Rangers coaches
Major League Baseball bullpen coaches
New York Yankees coaches
Major League Baseball pitching coaches
Sportspeople from Brooklyn
Baseball players from New York City
Toronto Blue Jays coaches
Auburn Twins players
Wisconsin Rapids Twins players
Tennessee Volunteers baseball coaches